The Amazing Race Australia 4 is the fourth season of the Australian reality television game show The Amazing Race Australia, an Australian spin-off of the American series The Amazing Race.

This season is the first to air on Network 10 after moving over from Seven Network and is hosted by former rugby league footballer Beau Ryan, replacing Grant Bowler, who hosted Seven's iteration of The Amazing Race Australia.

The fourth edition premiered on Monday 28 October 2019, with the show airing on Mondays and Tuesdays in the 7:30 p.m. time-slot on Network 10.

Newlyweds Tim and Rod Sattler-Jones were the winners of this season, making them the first romantic couple to win in the Australian franchise.

Production

Development and filming

In May 2019, rumours circulated that The Amazing Race Australia would return after five years when casting opened for an "Adventure Travel Competition" to be produced by Eureka Productions that was "looking for personality-packed teams of two to take part in a competitive reality travel series full of great prizes to be won!" On 29 May 2019, Beverley McGarvey, the chief content officer of Network 10, announced that the network was in the process of acquiring two franchises that would air at the end of the year saying, "We are doing The Masked Singer, which is different, a bit crazy and a proper original. The other thing, a franchise I can't talk about yet, will be huge for us too. We are finalising the contract at present.", and described the second franchise they were acquiring as "a bit more familiar."

The next day, TV Blackbox reported that CBS Studios International (the division of CBS that ran 10 at the time) had bought the rights to the Australian franchise of The Amazing Race with the series set to air in the final quarter of 2019. The American version airs in the United States on 10's parent network CBS (and airs locally on the Seven Network, which previously produced and aired the Australian series). On 27 June, Network 10 officially announced that it would be reviving The Amazing Race Australia with Beverley McGarvey announcing that a new series was set to air in late 2019 and that Beau Ryan would be serving as the new host.

On 3 September, during an episode of Australian Survivor, it was first revealed that The Amazing Race Australia would begin airing in October. The premiere date was later announced on 7 October after cast announcements began to be 28 October 2019.

The racecourse for this season travelled to eight countries across three continents (Asia, Africa and Oceania), racing 45,000 km in total. The season started outside of Australia at Seoul Plaza in Seoul, South Korea  making it the first time for the Australian series and fourth time in Amazing Race history, after the second Chinese season and the eight Israeli season, which was produced prior to the Australian series in December 2018 yet is set to air in early 2020 and the 34th American season which the Starting Line did not take place in the show's host country.

During the show's visit to Vietnam on Legs 3 and 4, the normal red & yellow route markers were used, unlike the first Australian season in which the route markers were replaced to avoid confusion with the former South Vietnamese national flag. This change follows seasons of The Amazing Race where the normal red & yellow route markers are used in the country after the 22nd American season.

The Speed Bump returned as the penalty for team that arrived in last place during a non-elimination leg. However, instead of a separate task, the Speed Bump added an additional aspect to the first task of the leg much like the Handicap on The Amazing Race Norge and the Speed Bump on the 27th American season.

During the season, Tom & Tyler tied the record for single-season leg wins at 8, a record which is shared with Marc & Rovilson, Rachel & Dave and Ashleigh & Amanda from the second Asian, 20th American and the next Australian seasons, respectively. With Tom & Tyler eliminated prior to the final leg, they also set a record for winning the most legs for an eliminated team as well.

This was the first (and to date, currently the only) season in the Australian version not to feature a no-rest leg.

Casting
Applications for the fourth season opened in May 2019 and were open to permanent residents and citizens from Australia and New Zealand, who were at least 18 years old. Applications for the 2019 edition were originally set to close on 31 May 2019 but were extended to 7 July 2019.

Marketing
Bankwest served as the major sponsor of this season, providing multiple leg prizes as well as Halo payment rings as a primary means of payment during many legs. Other sponsors included Tourism NT, Jetstar and Powerade Active Water.

Cast
The cast included North Melbourne rookie Tom Wilkinson would be racing with Southport midfielder Tyler Roos, the son of Australian Football Hall of Fame inductee Paul Roos, in which it was leaked prior to the start of filming. It also included two Missionaries of God's Love sisters, the first female firefighter in South Australia Adrienne Clarke, the show's first married Indigenous couple, and the show's first same-sex married couple following the passage of the Marriage Amendment (Definition and Religious Freedoms) Act 2017.

A month after filming concluded, influencer Sidney "Sid" Pierucci was arrested and charged with assault and destroy/damage property following an alleged domestic violence incident on 14 October in Bellevue Hill with police issuing an apprehended domestic violence order on behalf of Ashley "Ash" Ruscoe. After these reports came out, Ash stated in an interview that she and Sid had ended their relationship after filming concluded though stated that the show was not the cause of their breakup. Sid pleaded not guilty to the charges on 6 November 2019 at Downing Centre Local Court but later accepted a plea bargain by pleading guilty to a minor charge in February 2020 in exchange for no conviction.

Future appearances 
Jasmin & Jerome appeared during the next season to perform a Welcome to Country for the season's teams in Darwin, Northern Territory.

Results
The following teams participated in this season, with their relationships at the time of filming. Note that this table is not necessarily reflective of all content broadcast on television due to inclusion or exclusion of some data.

A  placement with a dagger indicates that the team was eliminated.
An  placement with a double-dagger indicates that the team was the last to arrive at a pit stop in a non-elimination leg, and had to perform a Speed Bump task in the following leg.
A  indicates that the team won the Fast Forward. 
 A  indicates that the team used a U-Turn and a  indicates the team on the receiving end of a U-Turn. 
A  indicates that the teams encountered an Intersection.

Notes

Prizes
Unlike previous seasons, only some legs featured prizes awarded to the first team to check-in at the Pit Stop. The prizes were:

Leg 2 – A$1,000 for each contestant, loaded on two Bankwest Halo rings.
Leg 6 – A$1,000 for each contestant, loaded on two Bankwest Halo rings.
Leg 11 – A holiday in the Northern Territory, on behalf of Holidays Australia, Discover Northern Territory and Jetstar.
Leg 12 – A$250,000

Race summary

Leg 1 (South Korea)

Airdate: 28 October 2019
Seoul, South Korea (Jung-gu – Seoul Plaza) (Starting Line)
Seoul (Namsan Park – Namsan Tower)
Seoul (Namsangol Hanok Village – Seoul Millennium Time Capsule)
 Seoul (Yeouido Hangang Park — Han River)
 Seoul (Jongno-gu — Gwangjang Market or Sageun-dong — Hanyang University Gymnasium)
Seoul (Hoehyeon-dong – Seoullo 7017 Bridge) 

In this season's first Roadblock, one team member had to ride a Flyboard on the Han River and reach a height of at least  to receive their next clue.

This season's first Detour was a choice between Fold 'Em Fast or Stack 'Em High. In Fold 'Em Fast, teams had to roll, fill and fold 50 dumplings to the dumpling master's satisfaction to receive their next clue. In Stack 'Em High, both team members had to take part in sport stacking, by stacking twelve cups in a demonstrated formation within eight seconds to receive their next clue from sport stacking world record holder Si Eun Kim.

Additional task
At Namsan Tower, teams had to search from the observation deck for yellow and red Amazing Race flags in the city below. After finding the flags, teams had to search the gift shop for a postcard that matched the location and contained the address on the back. Teams then had to make their way there on foot and find a "message from home", an inscription from former Premier of New South Wales John Fahey on the Seoul Millennium Time Capsule, to find their next clue.

Additional note
Alana & Niko fell so far behind when they reached the Roadblock, the location had closed for the day that all of the other teams had already checked in at the pit stop. Instead of Alana performing the Roadblock and the remaining tasks, Alana & Niko were instead instructed to go directly to the pit stop for elimination.

Leg 2 (South Korea)

Airdate: 29 October 2019
Seoul (Cheonggye Plaza – Spring Sculpture) (Pit Start)
Seoul (Sejongno — Gwanghwamun Plaza)
Paju (Imjingak Peace Park – Prayer Ribbon Fence)
 Cheorwon (Duroowell Bootcamp or Cheorwon Gym)
 Cheorwon (Hantan River — Goseokjeong Pavilion ) 

This leg's Detour was a choice between All Heart or All Thumbs. In All Heart, teams had to travel to a Korean military boot camp and complete challenges under a drill sergeant that involved carrying two tyres up a steep hill, navigating a high-rope course and crawling through a mud pit with a weighted backpack, which contained their next clue. In All Thumbs, teams had to participate in the relatively new sport of drone soccer at the Cheorwon Gym. Both members had to pilot a drone through a soccer course and score a goal each before receiving their next clue from the drone master.
 
Additional tasks
At Gwanghwamun Plaza, teams had to count the number of fountains and give the correct answer (364) to a gardener to receive their next clue.
At Imjingak Peace Park in the Korean Demilitarised Zone, also known as the DMZ, teams had to write a message of love and hope on a prayer ribbon and tie it to the prayer ribbon fence, before receiving their next clue from a souvenir store owner.
Following the Detour, teams had to raft down the Hantan River to their next Pit Stop at Goseokjeong Pavilion.

Leg 3 (South Korea → Vietnam)

Airdate: 4 November 2019
Seoul (Namdaemunno) (Pit Start)
 Seoul (Incheon International Airport) to Hanoi, Vietnam (Noi Bai International Airport)
Hanoi (Thang Long Water Puppet Theatre) (Overnight Rest)
 Hanoi (Giáp Bát Bus Station ) to Ninh Bình
 Ninh Xuân (Hành cung Vũ Lâm — Paddy Fields or Ngô Đồng River )
Hoa Lư (Tam Cốc Wharf) 
 Hoa Lư (Lãng Khanh Hostel & Restaurant)
Hoa Lư (Hang Múa) 

This leg's Detour was a choice between Escargot or Make Boat Go. In Escargot, teams had to harvest 100 snails from a paddy field to receive their next clue. In Make Boat Go, teams had to row a Vietnamese-style boat using the soles of their feet to a giant rock with their next clue.

In this leg's Roadblock, teams had to travel to Lãng Khanh Hostel & Restaurant, where they would find 300 banana leaf-wrapped young green rice parcels, nine of which contained a golden coin. One team member had to find a parcel with a coin before receiving their next clue. If a parcel didn't have a coin in it, they had to consume the contents of it, some of which had additional fillings including chillis.

Additional task
At the Thang Long Water Puppet Theatre, teams had to sign up for one of three water puppet shows, for three teams each and ten minutes apart. Once inside, teams would find a clue instructing them to watch the show to determine the location of their next clue. Teams had to figure out that the dragon puppets in the show had words on their necks, which read "Ben Xe Giap Bat", the Giáp Bát bus station.

Leg 4 (Vietnam)

Airdate: 5 November 2019
Ninh Bình (The Reed Hotel) (Pit Start)
Hoa Lư (Hoa Lư Ancient Citadel and Chùa Nhất Trụ ) 
  Ninh Bình (Chùa Vàng Ninh Nhất )
Gia Viễn (Bái Đính Temple – Bell Tower)
Gia Viễn (Bái Đính Temple – Hồ Tiên) 

For their Speed Bump, Rowah & Amani had to prepare five  bundles of incense sticks instead of four during the first task.

This leg's Detour was a choice between Short Strokes or Long Strides. In Short Strokes, both team members had to wear a Full Moon Festival mask and replicate the mask worn by their partner by painting another mask to receive their next clue. In Long Strides, one team member at a time had to walk a circuit on the temple grounds on stilts without falling to receive their next clue.

In this season's first Fast Forward, teams had to load a bicycle with 320 shrimp baskets and deliver them to a fisherman. The first team to complete this task would win the Fast Forward award. Jasmin & Jerome won the Fast Forward.

Additional tasks
At Hoa Lư Ancient Citadel, teams had to find a massive pile of incense sticks, make four  bundles of sticks within  and then deliver them to Chùa Nhất Trụ to receive their next clue.
At Bái Đính Temple, teams had to search among 500 Buddha statues to find the one with both feet on an animal: Pháp Luận Sơn. Teams then had to climb up the temple's bell tower to make their guess, and if they were correct, they would ring the bell and receive their next clue.

Leg 5 (Vietnam → Mongolia)

Airdate: 11 November 2019
 Hanoi (Noi Bai International Airport) to Ulaanbaatar, Mongolia (Chinggis Khaan International Airport)
Ulaanbaatar (Zaisan Memorial)
Ulaanbaatar (Gandan Monastery – Janraisig Temple)
 Ulaanbaatar (Dragon Bus Terminal) to Govi-Altai (Mongol Els  – Gers) 
Govi-Altai (Mongol Els Sand Dunes) 

This leg's Detour was a choice between Milk the Best or Herd the Rest. In Milk the Best, teams had to milk a goat until they reached the marked line on the cup to receive their next clue. In Herd the Rest, teams had to use traditional Mongolian tools to capture and mark four goats with paint to receive their next clue.

Additional tasks
At the base of the Zaisan Memorial, teams had to climb 300 steps to reach the memorial and find their next clue.
At the Gandan Monastery, teams had to spin and count the prayer wheels in the temple and give the correct answer (287) to the lead monk to receive their next clue.
At the Dragon Bus Terminal, teams had to board one of three buses, the first and third of which carried three teams and the second two teams, to Mongol Els. Once there, team members had to complete a welcome ceremony by each drinking a bowl of fermented horse milk before receiving their next clue.

Leg 6 (Mongolia)

Airdate: 12 November 2019
Gobi Gurvansaikhan National Park (Khongoryn Els Sand Dunes) (Pit Start)
 Gobi Gurvansaikhan National Park (Khongoryn Gol Pasture)
 Ulaanbaatar (Ulaanbaatar Ensemble Theatre or Narantuul Market)
Ulaanbaatar (Chingisiin Khuree Camp) 

In this leg's Roadblock, one team member had to learn a traditional Mongolian chant, used to introduce a Mongolian wrestling match, and successfully reiterate it to receive their next clue.

This leg's Detour was a choice between Dance or Deliver. In Dance, teams had to learn and correctly perform the Durvun Oird, a traditional folk dance, with a dance troupe in front of an audience at Ulaanbaatar Ensemble Theatre to receive their next clue. In Deliver, teams had to deliver boots, furniture and an oven, which teams had to assemble after delivering it, consecutively to specific stalls, while navigating through thousands of stalls within Narantuul Market, Mongolia's largest market, to receive their next clue.

Additional task
On the Khongoryn Els Sand Dunes, teams had to dig within a marked area to find a box, which contained their next clue. Due to hot temperatures, there was a four-hour time limit for teams to complete the task. If teams were unable to complete within the time limit, they would incur a two-hour penalty at the Pit Stop.

Leg 7 (Mongolia → Zimbabwe → Zambia)

Airdate: 18 November 2019
Ulaanbaatar (Choijin Lama Temple) (Pit Start)
 Ulaanbaatar (Chinggis Khaan International Airport) to Victoria Falls, Zimbabwe (Victoria Falls Airport)
Victoria Falls National Park (Victoria Falls Bridge)
Livingstone, Zambia (Batoka Sky Aerodrome) 
Livingstone District (Mukuni Village)  
 Mosi-oa-Tunya National Park (Livingstone Island Launch Site and Victoria Falls – Livingstone Island)
Mosi-oa-Tunya National Park (The Elephant Café) 

In this leg's Roadblock, one team member had to fly in a microlight above Victoria Falls and spot six letters on the ground that they had to unscramble to identify the location of their next clue: Mukuni Village. 

This leg's Detour was a choice between Cultivate or Separate. In Cultivate, teams had to attach a plow to two oxen and then lead them to cultivate a field by creating eight straight furrows to receive their next clue from a farmer. In Separate, teams had to assemble a dividing thatch fence along a house of a newlywed couple to receive their next clue from a village elder.

Additional tasks
Outside the Victoria Falls Airport, teams received a traditional welcome ceremony in which a local village's chieftain spat water on them as a blessing. Teams would then receive their next clue instructing them to travel by taxi to the Victoria Falls Bridge, cross the bridge by foot over the Zambezi into Zambia and then take another taxi to Batoka Sky Aerodrome to find their next clue.
At Mukuni Village, teams encountered an Intersection, which required two teams to join up and play a melody in sync on the marimba, an African percussion instrument. Once they played the melody correctly, teams would receive their next clue from the bandleader and were no longer Intersected.
After the Detour, teams would find a tablet with a video message from their loved ones, who informed them that their next clue was on Livingstone Island. Teams had to drive themselves to the Livingstone Island Launch Site and board one of two tourist boats to take them to the island. If teams missed both boats, they would have to wait up to 45 minutes.

Additional note
For their safety and to avoid scaring the elephants at the Elephant Café, teams had to walk along a marked path to the Pit Stop but could not leave the path or run.

Leg 8 (Zambia → Zimbabwe)

Airdate: 19 November 2019
Zambezi National Park, Zimbabwe (Border Kiosk) (Pit Start)
 Victoria Falls National Park (Batoka Gorge) 
 Victoria Falls (Victoria Falls Private Game Reserve)
Chisuma Village (Chisuma Primary School) 
Victoria Falls (Mpala Village) 

In this leg's Roadblock, one team member had to don a gorge swing harness before free-falling headfirst  into the Batoka Gorge and swinging across the hippopotamus-filled Zambezi River. After returning atop the ledge, teams would receive their next clue. 

For their Speed Bump, Sid & Ash both had to ride the gorge swing into the Batoka Gorge, one after the other.

In this season's second Fast Forward, teams had to correctly identify 10 sets of animal droppings using a list with brief descriptions and place them in front of the corresponding animal carvings. The first team to do so would win the Fast Forward award. Tom & Tyler won the Fast Forward.

This leg's Detour was a choice between Build It or Serve It. In Build It, teams had to assemble two pieces of playground equipment from a choice of swings, a seesaw and monkey bars to the satisfaction of the school's principal to receive their next clue. In Serve It, teams had to cook a traditional Zimbabwean meal, mielie meal porridge, for 10 school children to receive their next clue.

Additional tasks
At Victoria Falls Private Game Reserve, teams had to identify five signs of illegal poaching (an axe, bullets, a fire pit, cigarettes and a matchbox) and relay them to the gamekeeper to receive their next clue.
At Chisuma Primary School, teams had to find their next clue in the suggestions box.
At Mpala Village, teams had to carry a bucket of water on their head and walk to the Pit Stop, where they presented their buckets to the village elder.

Leg 9 (Zimbabwe → Malawi)

Airdate: 25 November 2019
Mosi-oa-Tunya National Park, Zambia (Avani Victoria Falls Resort) (Pit Start)
 Livingstone (Harry Mwanga Nkumbula International Airport) to Lilongwe, Malawi (Kamuzu International Airport)
Lilongwe (Mgona Market)
 Chezi (Chezi Market) 
Salima District (Brickmaking Area)
Mphere (Lake Malawi – Kumbali Lake Retreat)
Mphere (Lifuwu Village) 

This leg's Detour was a choice between Stack or Stitch. In Stack, teams had to pack a bag with charcoal until it overflowed yet was held in place by sticks and strings. Once the stack was secure, the sticks would be removed, and teams then had to deliver the bag to a vendor to receive their next clue. In Stitch, teams had to sew together two traditional shirts using a sewing machine powered by a treadle to receive their next clue.

Additional tasks
At Mgona Market, teams had to shell and winnow at least  of peanuts to receive their next clue.
After the Detour, teams had to properly mix and mould 50 acceptable clay bricks to receive their next clue.
At Kumbali Lake Retreat, one team member had to run into Lake Malawi to retrieve a bag of puzzle pieces, but the directions to the bag were spoken in Chichewa with the team member on shore having to guide their partner using a blackboard that listed translated word. Once the bag was found, teams had to assemble the pieces inside to form a statue to receive their next clue.

Additional note
After landing in Malawi, teams found Beau outside the airport and were informed that they had to vote to U-Turn a team before they could continue racing. The vote was an open vote, and the voting order was determined by most number of votes. The team's votes, as well as the voting order, outlined below.

{|class="wikitable" style="text-align:center"
|-
!align="left"|U-Turned
|Tim & Rod
|-
!align="left"|Result
|4–1
|-
!Voter
!colspan=2|Team's Vote
|-
!Tim & Rod
|Tom & Tyler
|-
!Jasmin & Jerome
|bgcolor=tan |Tim & Rod
|-
!Viv & Joey
|bgcolor=tan |Tim & Rod
|-
!Tom & Tyler
|bgcolor=tan |Tim & Rod
|-
!Femi & Nick
|bgcolor=tan |Tim & Rod
|-
|}

Leg 10 (Malawi)

Airdate: 26 November 2019
Mphere (Leopard Bay Beach) (Pit Start)  
 Mphere (Lifuwu Village) 
 Lilongwe (Lizulu Market)
Lilongwe (Lizulu Market – Nsapato Section)
Lilongwe (Harry's Bar)
Lilongwe (Kumbali Lodge) 

For their Speed Bump, Viv & Joey had to empty their waterlogged canoes before commencing the canoeing task. 

This leg's Detour was a choice between Dirty or Smelly. In Dirty, teams had to wash 30 items of clothing at a washing station on the beach and lay them out to dry to receive their next clue. In Smelly, teams had to bring a bucket of fish to a drying table and sort the fish into three separate species to receive their next clue. 

In this leg's Roadblock, one team member had to make two pairs of sandals made from recycled items including a tyre to receive their next clue from a cobbler.

Additional tasks
At Leopard Bay Beach, both team members had to row a traditional dugout canoe  back to Lifuwu Village to find their next clue.
In the Nsapato Section of Lizulu Market, teams had to listen for a megaphone, typically used to advertise stall goods, that was broadcasting their next clue.
At Harry's Bar, each team member had to take a two-minute quiz about events from previous legs to receive their next clue. Teams received a one-minute time penalty for each incorrect answer that would be served at the Pit Stop.
{|class="wikitable" style="text-align:center"
|-
!#
!Question
!Answer
|-
!1
|Who jumped the elevator queue in Namsan Tower?
|Tom & Tyler
|-
!2
|Which team attempted a Fast Forward, then gave up?
|Tim & Rod
|-
!3
|Who gave up the stilts for shrimp baskets in Vietnam?
|Jasmin & Jerome
|-
!4
|Which team was second to arrive to build play equipment in Zimbabwe?
|Femi & Nick
|-
!5
|Which team took two clues leaving a team with none?
|Sid & Ash
|-
!6
|Which team took four attempts to sing their Mongolian wrestling song?
|Hayley & Mikayla
|-
!7
|Which team spent the most time in a taxi in the first leg?
|Alana & Niko
|-
!8
|Who was overtaken in the last 30 seconds of the second leg?
|Judy & Therese
|-
!9
|Who successfully stacked cups and paddled with their feet?
|Rowah & Amani
|-
!10
|Who nailed flyboarding in under two minutes?
|Chris & Adrienne
|-
|}
Following the quiz, teams had to learn a local Malawian song in the native language of Chichewa and then perform on stage to receive their next clue.

Leg 11 (Malawi → Thailand)

Airdate: 2 December 2019
Lilongwe (President Walmont Hotel) (Pit Start)
 Lilongwe (Kamuzu International Airport) to Bangkok, Thailand (Suvarnabhumi Airport)
Bangkok (Khlong Toei Market)
 Bangkok (Chao Phraya River or Tuk-Tuk Garage)
Bangkok (Sathorn Pier) 
 Bangkok (Kudi Khao Community Center)
Bangkok (Wat Suwannaram) 

This season's final Detour was a choice between Water or Wheels. In Water, teams had to ride a long-tail boat on the Chao Phraya River and memorise 12 riverside landmarks. Then, teams had to place images of the landmarks in the correct spots on a map to receive their next clue. In Wheels, teams had to properly attach parts to a tuk-tuk and decorate it to receive their next clue.

In this leg's Roadblock, one team member had to fit three patients with a set of dentures to receive their next clue.

Additional tasks
At Khlong Toei Market, each team member had to eat three century eggs to receive their next clue.
Outside Wat Suwannaram, teams had to completely gold leaf a statue of Ganesh and then bring it to Beau at the Pit Stop.

Additional note
During the flight from Lilongwe to Bangkok, each team voted in secret for a team to U-Turn. The vote was an open vote, and the voting order was determined by most number of votes. The team's votes, as well as the voting order, outlined below.

{|class="wikitable" style="text-align:center"
|-
!align="left"|U-Turned
|Tom & Tyler
|-
!align="left"|Result
|3–1
|-
!Voter
!colspan=2|Team's Vote
|-
!Tim & Rod
|bgcolor=tan |Tom & Tyler
|-
!Jasmin & Jerome
|bgcolor=tan |Tom & Tyler
|-
!Viv & Joey
|bgcolor=tan |Tom & Tyler
|-
!Tom & Tyler
|Tim & Rod
|-
|}

Leg 12 (Thailand → Australia)

Airdate: 3 December 2019
 Bangkok (Suvarnabhumi Airport) to Darwin, Northern Territory, Australia (Darwin International Airport)
Darwin (Darwin Waterfront Precinct and Big Buoy Water Park)
 Darwin (Darwin International Airport — Top End Tandems) to Katherine
Katherine (Katherine Outback Experience) 
 Nitmiluk National Park (Nitmiluk National Park Heli Pad to Nitmiluk Gorge) 

In this season's final Roadblock, one team member had to train a Cattle Dog to run through a figure-eight course and then tame a wild horse by touching it to receive their next clue.

Additional tasks
After arriving in Darwin, teams had to search the airport for a Jetstar representative with their next clue.
At the Darwin Waterfront Precinct, teams had to find stacks of Northern Territory News newspapers, one of which was on top of a Big Buoy Water Park inflatable, and then sort out the sensational headlines to find eight related to events which happened on previous legs. Once found, teams had to present their headlines to the paper's editor Matt Williams, who would give them their next clue if they were all correct. The correct headlines were:
{| class="wikitable"
|-
! Headline
! Reference
|-
| "A Couple of Basket Cases Jump the Queue"
| Tom & Tyler and Viv & Joey skipping the queue at Namsan Tower
|-
| "Flying Firefighter Saves the Day"
| Adrienne completing the Leg 1 Roadblock
|-
| "Ungodly Dumpling Theft"
| Sid & Ash's stealing a dumpling from Judy & Therese 
|-
| "Slippery Suckers Cause Dunking"
| Leg 3's Escargot Detour
|-
| "Birthday Girl Vomits Golden Opportunity"
| Mikayla vomiting during the Leg 3 Roadblock
|-
| "Desert's Storm Forces Alien Alliances"
| Leg 6's desert digging task
|-
| "Big Voice Serenades Tough Guys"
| Leg 6's Mongolian chant Roadblock
|-
| "Royal Watery Welcome"
| Local greeting in Zimbabwe
|-
|}
After boarding a plane to Katherine, teams had to land by performing a  tandem skydive. After they completed the jump, teams were given their Roadblock clue.
After the Roadblock, teams had to board a helicopter to Nitmiluk Gorge. After landing, teams had to kayak on the Katherine River to find seven puzzle pieces hidden throughout the gorge. After finding the missing pieces and returning to the landing site, teams had to sort pieces from amongst several decoy pieces to find the ones depicting country flags, locations, eliminated teams, currencies and challenges from previous legs and assemble the correct pieces into six cubes so that each cube represented one country. The correct answers were:
{| class="wikitable"
|-
! Leg
! Flag
! Currency
! Challenge
! Locations
! Teams eliminated
|-
! 1
| rowspan="2"| Flag of South Korea
| rowspan="2"| Won
| rowspan="2"| All Heart or All Thumbs
| rowspan="2"| Namsangol Hanok Village
| Alana & Niko
|-
! 2
| Judy & Therese 
|-
! 3
| rowspan="2"| Flag of Vietnam
| rowspan="2"| Đồng
| rowspan="2"| Short Strokes or Long Strides
| rowspan="2"| Bái Đính Temple
| rowspan="2"| Rowah & Amani
|-
! 4
|-
! 5
| rowspan="2"| Flag of Mongolia
| rowspan="2"| Tugrik
| rowspan="2"| Durvun Oird or Narantuul
| rowspan="2"| Janraisig Temple
| Chris & Adrienne
|-
! 6
| Hayley & Mikayla
|-
! 7
| Flag of Zambia
| rowspan="2" 
| rowspan="2"| Build Up or Serve Up
| The Elephant Café
| rowspan="2"| Sid & Ash
|-
! 8
| Flag of Zimbabwe
| Chisuma
|-
! 9 
| rowspan="2"| Flag of Malawi
| rowspan="2"| Kwacha
| rowspan="2"| Stack or Stich
| Mgona Market
| rowspan="2"| Femi & Nick
|-
! 10
| Lizulu Market
|-
! 11
| Flag of Thailand
| Baht
| Wheels or Water
| Khlong Toei Market
| Tom & Tyler
|-
|}
Then, teams had to stack the cubes to receive their final clue directing them to the Finish Line.

Additional note
Due to unfavourable wind conditions, Viv & Joey were unable to complete the skydive task and had to land at the nearby Katherine Airport instead. Since neither teams' time differences nor placements were affected, Viv & Joey were immediately given the next clue without being issued a time penalty.

Reception

Ratings
Ratings data is from OzTAM and represents the viewership from the 5 largest Australian metropolitan centres (Sydney, Melbourne, Brisbane, Perth and Adelaide).

Notes

References

External links

Australia 4
2019 Australian television seasons
Television shows filmed in South Korea
Television shows filmed in Vietnam
Television shows filmed in Mongolia
Television shows filmed in Zambia
Television shows filmed in Zimbabwe
Television shows filmed in Malawi
Television shows filmed in Thailand
Television shows filmed in Australia